Cross-country skiing was inducted at the Youth Olympic Games at the inaugural edition in 2012.

Medal summaries

Boys' 10 kilometres

Boys' sprint

Boys' cross-country cross

Girls' 5 kilometre

Girls' sprint

Girls' cross-country cross

Medal table
As of the 2020 Winter Youth Olympics.

See also
Cross-country skiing at the Winter Olympics

External links
Youth Olympic Games

 
Youth Olympics
Cross-country skiing